Lake Timberline is an unincorporated community and census-designated place (CDP) in St. Francois County, Missouri, United States. The community is built around several reservoirs built in the valleys of Bee Run and Primrose Creek, southwest-flowing tributaries of the Big River, which in turn flows northwest to the Meramec River. 

The community is in northern St. Francois County, bordered to the north by Jefferson County.

The community was first listed as a CDP prior to the 2020 census.

Demographics

References 

Census-designated places in St. Francois County, Missouri
Census-designated places in Missouri